Cho Min-sun (born March 21, 1972) is a South Korean judoka.

Cho won a gold medal in the middleweight division at the 1996 Summer Olympics and a bronze medal at the 2000 Summer Olympics, and also won two gold medals at the 1993 and 1995 World Championships.

She also won a bronze medal in the -48 kg division at the 1988 Summer Olympics in Seoul, where women's judo was held as a demonstration sport.

Cho is the only South Korean judoka to win national championships in five different judo divisions: from 48 to 66 kg.

She is currently a full professor at Korea National Sport University in Seoul.

References

External links
 
 
 

1972 births
Living people
Judoka at the 1996 Summer Olympics
Judoka at the 2000 Summer Olympics
Olympic judoka of South Korea
Olympic gold medalists for South Korea
Olympic bronze medalists for South Korea
Olympic medalists in judo
Asian Games medalists in judo
Judoka at the 1990 Asian Games
Judoka at the 1994 Asian Games
South Korean female judoka
Medalists at the 2000 Summer Olympics
Medalists at the 1996 Summer Olympics
Asian Games silver medalists for South Korea
Asian Games bronze medalists for South Korea
Medalists at the 1990 Asian Games
Medalists at the 1994 Asian Games
Universiade medalists in judo
Universiade gold medalists for South Korea
Medalists at the 1995 Summer Universiade
Judo referees
People from South Jeolla Province
Sportspeople from South Jeolla Province
Academic staff of Korea National Sport University